Nigel Plaskitt (born 27 July 1950) is an English actor, puppeteer, producer, and stage and television director.

Career
His voice and puppetry talents have appeared on television shows such as Pipkins (for which he provided the narration, as well as voicing and operating the characters of Hartley Hare and Tortoise), Spitting Image and Gerry Anderson's New Captain Scarlet. He has also contributed to films, such as The Muppet Christmas Carol,  Muppet Treasure Island and The Hitchhiker's Guide to the Galaxy.

Plaskitt appeared as Unstoffe in the four-part Doctor Who science-fiction serial The Ribos Operation in 1978.

In British television advertisements, Plaskitt appeared as the character Malcolm, a young man suffering from a heavy cold, in a series of commercials for Vicks Sinex nasal spray from 1972 to 1981 and a one-off revival commercial in 1993. He was also the puppeteer behind the ITV Digital/PG Tips Monkey.

He also narrated The Rev. W. Awdry's letter to Christopher at the beginning of some UK and US broadcasts of Thomas and Friends.

He has also been puppet coach and puppet director for the British Theatre, staging the UK tour of Doctor Dolittle, resident puppet consultant on the West End production of Avenue Q, and director of several shows — including Spitting Image colleague Louise Gold's cabaret act.

He also was involved with the Gorillaz Demon Days: Live at the Manchester Opera House on 1–5 November 2005, as a PA for the puppets of Murdoc and 2D when they came out in the beginning of the show. The puppets of Murdoc and 2-D reappeared after the Main Set was over when the curtains fell after their choral outro, Demon Days, and they edged on the audience for an encore and the curtains then rose to an encore of Hong Kong and Latin Simone.

Filmography

Film
Spy Story (1976) - Mason
Charleston (1977) - Hotel Receptionist (uncredited)
The Killing Edge (1984) - Man from labour camp
Labyrinth (1985) - Additional Muppet Performer
Little Shop of Horrors (1986) - Plant Pod Performer
The Muppet Christmas Carol (1992) - Additional Muppet Performer
Muppet Treasure Island (1996) - Additional Muppet Performer and Coordinator
Lost in Space (1998) Robot team
Harry Potter and the Philosopher's Stone - (2000) Voice of the Mountain Troll
The Hitchhiker's Guide to the Galaxy (2005) - Vogon Performer
Muppets Most Wanted (2014) - UK Muppet Performer and Coordinator
Come Away' (2020) - White Rabbit

TelevisionChurchill's People (1975) - SoldierWarship (1976) - StewardPipkins (1976–1978) - Hartley Hare, Tortoise, Mooney the Badger, Uncle Hare,  Angus McHare and NarratorOwner Occupied (1977) - Corporal KleinThe Sunday Drama - The Man Who Liked Elephants (1977) - JingoDoctor Who (1978) - UnstoffeGolden Soak (1979) - Customs officerYoung at Heart (1981) - KennethAngels (1982) - Martin FisherThe Cleopatras (1983) - LyconSpitting Image (1984 - 1996) - PuppeteerThe Pickwick Papers (1985) - Man at poundThe Tale of the Bunny Picnic (1986) - Additional Muppet PerformerTreehouse (1987–1988) - Mr. TreeHot Dog (1988) - Big DogSpooks of Bottle Bay (1992) - Sid Sludge, Teacher & othersThe Secret Life of Toys (1994) - MewRoger and the Rottentrolls (1996-2000) - Aysgarth (puppetry)Potamus Park (1997) - Herbie, Mo, MindyRound the Bend  (1988 - 1991)  Vince VerminAlice in Wonderland (1999) - The Dormouse (voice)Mopatop's Shop (1999 - 2001) - Moosey Mouse, Bradley, LamontCombat Sheep (2001) - MooseRipley and Scuff (2002) - Ripley, BargieThe Dan and Dusty Show (2004) - Dan21st Century Pipkins (2005) - Hartley HareGerry Anderson's New Captain Scarlet (2005) - Captain Black, Doctor Gold, Stormtrooper (voices)Five Minutes More (2006) - FarawayThomas & Friends (2004–2011) - Awdry's Letter Narrator (voice)An Audience with Joe Pasquale - (2005)  Gonzo's cousin KevinBunnytown - (2007) - Lil Bad Bunny, King Bunny & OthersThat Puppet Game Show (2013–2014) - Udders McGee, Hot Dog, Fenton & AnnouncerComic Relief: Monkey's Monumental Mission (2015) - MonkeyMonty & Co. (2020) - Monty, Snail, Charlie & Narrator & Producer

Video gamesThe Muppet CDROM: Muppets Inside (1996) - Additional voices
Theatre

 Doctor Dolittle - The Musical  (1998)  Puppet Coordinator and Director  - West End and Tour
 Avenue Q - West end and Tours (2005 - ) Puppet Coach
 Cupid and Psyche - The Little Angel Theatre  (2001) Director
 Louise Gold... by appointment (2002) Director
 The Secret Garden - Little Angel Theatre - (2003) - Director
 Demon Days Live - Manchester Opera House - (2005) - Murdoc Niccals
 Little Shop of Horrors - Menier Chocolate Factory - (2006) Plant Consultant
 Peppa Pig's Party Live - West End and Tours - (2009) Puppet Coach
 Peppa Pig's Treasure Hunt Live - West End and Tours - (2011)  Director 
 Anglo the Musical - Kite Productions Dublin - Puppet Coach

References

Simon Sheridan's The A to Z of Classic Children's Television (Reynolds & Hearn books, 2004, reprinted 2007) . Features an interview with Nigel Plaskitt and his work on the series Pipkins''.

External links
Official Website

1950 births
British puppeteers
English male film actors
English male television actors
English male voice actors
English puppeteers
English television producers
English theatre managers and producers
Living people
Muppet performers